NGC 7410 is a barred spiral galaxy located in the constellation Grus. It is about 122 million light-years away. It was discovered on 15 July 1826, by James Dunlop.

References 

7410
Spiral galaxies
Grus (constellation)